Gargoyle is a free OpenWrt-based Linux distribution for a range of wireless routers based on Broadcom, Atheros, MediaTek and others chipsets, Asus Routers, Netgear, Linksys and TP-Link routers. Among notable features is the ability to limit and monitor bandwidth and set bandwidth caps per specific IP address.

Main features
 Network file storage sharing, SMB, CIFS.
 VPN server and VPN client (OpenVPN and WireGuard).
 Tor server and Tor client.
 Advertisement blocking.
 Wifi scheduled on/off.
 Bandwidth monitoring
 Quotas, limits and bandwidth throttling
 Quality of service (QoS) with active congestion control
 Website blacklisting by hostname or IP address

Version history

See also
 List of wireless router firmware projects

References

External links
 
 Repository on GitHub

Custom firmware
Embedded Linux distributions
Free routing software
Linux distributions